Dichlorvos (2,2-dichlorovinyl dimethyl phosphate, commonly abbreviated as an DDVP) is an organophosphate widely used as an insecticide to control household pests, in public health, and protecting stored products from insects. The compound has been commercially available since 1961 and has become controversial because of its prevalence in urban waterways and the fact that its toxicity extends well beyond insects. Since 1988, dichlorvos cannot be used as a plant protection product in the EU.

Use 
Dichlorvos is effective against mushroom flies, aphids, spider mites, caterpillars, thrips, and whiteflies in greenhouses and in outdoor crops. It is also used in the milling and grain handling industries and to treat a variety of parasitic worm infections in animals and humans. It is fed to livestock to control botfly larvae in manure. It acts against insects as both a contact poison and an ingested poison. It is available as an aerosol and soluble concentrate. It is also used in pet flea collars and "no-pest strips" in the form of a pesticide-impregnated plastic; this material has been available to households since 1964 and has been the source of some concern, partly due to misuse.

Properties
Dichlorvos is a colourless liquid with aromatic odour. Dichlorvos is soluble in water.

Mechanism of action
Dichlorvos, like other organophosphate insecticides, acts on acetylcholinesterase, associated with the nervous systems of insects. Evidence for other modes of action, applicable to higher animals, have been presented. It is claimed to damage DNA of insects.

Regulation
The United States Environmental Protection Agency has reviewed the safety data of dichlorvos several times. In 1995 a voluntary agreement was reached with the supplier, Amvac Chemical Corporation, which restricted the use of dichlorvos in many, but not all, domestic uses, all aerial applications, and other uses. Additional voluntary cancellations were implemented in 2006, 2008, and 2010. Major concerns focus on acute and chronic toxicity and the fact that this pesticide is prevalent in urban waterways.  A 2010 study found that each 10-fold increase in urinary concentration of organophosphate metabolites was associated with a 55% to 72% increase in the odds of ADHD in children.

Safety
People can be exposed to dichlorvos in the workplace by breathing it in, skin absorption, swallowing it, and eye contact. The Occupational Safety and Health Administration (OSHA) has set the legal limit (permissible exposure limit) for dichlorvos exposure in the workplace as 1 mg/m3 over an 8-hour workday. The National Institute for Occupational Safety and Health (NIOSH) has set a recommended exposure limit (REL) of 1 mg/m3 over an 8-hour workday. At levels of 100 mg/m3, dichlorvos is immediately dangerous to life or health (IDLH).

Effects on humans 
Since it is an acetylcholinesterase inhibitor, symptoms of dichlorvos exposure include weakness, headache, tightness in chest, blurred vision, salivation, sweating, nausea, vomiting, diarrhea, abdominal cramps, eye and skin irritation, miosis (pupil constriction), eye pain, runny nose, wheezing, laryngospasm, cyanosis, anorexia, muscle fasciculation, paralysis, dizziness, ataxia, convulsions, hypotension (low blood pressure), and cardiac arrhythmias.

It is also known to affect DNA replication in bacteria.

In popular culture
Dichlorvos is mentioned in John Brunner's science fiction novel The Sheep Look Up. One of the book's many vignettes tells of a woman who nearly dies, having taken barbiturates and gone to sleep in a closed room where a fly-killing strip doused with the material was placed.

See also 
Metrifonate (converts into dichlorvos)
Naled (can convert into dichlorvos)

References

External links 
 Extension Toxicology Network - Pesticide Information Profiles - Dichlorvos (last maintained 1996)
 CDC - NIOSH Pocket Guide to Chemical Hazards
 Australian Pesticides & Veterinary Medicines Authority Chemical Review Program - Dichlorvos
 Material Safety Data Sheet (MSDS) for Dichlorvos
 
 BBC News: Insecticide ban amid cancer fears

Acetylcholinesterase inhibitors
IARC Group 2B carcinogens
Organochlorides
Organophosphate insecticides